Lucca Staiger (born June 14, 1988) is a German professional basketball player for Löwen Braunschweig of the German Basketball Bundesliga (BBL). He played collegiate basketball for Iowa State University.

Junior career
Staiger was one of the top junior players in Germany.  He led his high school team to the 2005 German High School Championship while averaging 24.2 points, 5.6 rebounds, and 6.2 assists.  He spent his senior season at Decatur Christian High School in Illinois, averaging 13.3 points, 4.2 rebounds, and 2.4 assists per game en route to being selected to play in the Illinois Premier Basketball High School All-Star Game. As a high school player, he also competed with the German national basketball team at the 2005 FIBA Europe Under-18 Championship and 2006 FIBA Europe Under-20 Championship.

College career
Staiger was declared ineligible for his freshman season with the Cyclones and was forced to sit out the entire season and lose a year of eligibility.  He came back strong during his sophomore season, averaging 8.2 points and 24 minutes per game, while slowly becoming a larger part of the rotation throughout the season.  He scored a career high 24 points in an early season loss to Drake University while hitting eight three-pointers.  He was named Big 12 Rookie of the Week twice during the season.

Following the season, Staiger competed with the senior German national basketball team for the first time at EuroBasket 2009. He averaged 5 points per game over the team's six games, including a team-high 14 in the team's second-round game versus Macedonia.

On January 19, 2010, Staiger announced he was leaving Iowa State, effective immediately, to pursue a professional career in Europe.

Professional career
Coming out of the college, Staiger joined the German BBL team Alba Berlin. In 2012, he joined the league rivals Neckar Riesen Ludwigsburg. After just one year, on June 25, 2013, it was announced that he would be joining Bayern Munich.

On July 8, 2015, Staiger signed a contract with Brose Bamberg. He parted ways with the team in July 2018. On August 6, 2018, Staiger signed a one-year deal with Iberostar Tenerife of the Liga ACB.

On December 13, 2019, he has signed with Löwen Braunschweig of the German Basketball Bundesliga (BBL).

References

External links
Lucca Staiger at beko-bbl.de
Lucca Staiger at eurobasket.com
Lucca Staiger at euroleague.net

1988 births
Living people
2010 FIBA World Championship players
Alba Berlin players
Basketball Löwen Braunschweig players
Brose Bamberg players
CB Canarias players
FC Bayern Munich basketball players
German expatriate basketball people in the United States
German expatriate basketball people in Spain
German men's basketball players
Iowa State Cyclones men's basketball players
Liga ACB players
Riesen Ludwigsburg players
Sportspeople from Ulm
Shooting guards